Tholakele "Tholie" Madala (13 July 1937 – 25 August 2010) was a judge in the Constitutional Court of South Africa. He was appointed to the bench in 1994 by Nelson Mandela. He retired in 2008.

References

1937 births
2010 deaths
South African judges
Judges of the Constitutional Court of South Africa